Emlak Kredi Bank was a former Turkish public bank specialized in real estate that operated from 1946 until the government liquidated the bank in 2001.

History
It was founded on 1 September 1946 with a founding capital of 110.000.000 Turkish lira. A former bank named Emlak ve Eytam Bank was merged to Emlak Kredi Bank. In the following years, the number of its branch offices was increased to 307. Some of the important housing projects financed by the bank were in Ankara , İstanbul, Eskişehir, Edirne, İzmir,  Urfa, Çankırı and Diyarbakır. The bank also built a number of notable public buildings such as the central headquarters of Central Bank of the Republic of Turkey central headquarters of Turkish Radio and Television Corporation, public housing of Turkish parliament members etc.

Beginning by 1980s, some other small banks were merged to Emlak Kredi. On 8 January 1988, Anadolu Bank (which itself was a merger of two former banks) and on 29 November 1992, Denzicilik Bank were merged to Emlak Kredi Bank.

However, on 3 July 2001, the government decided to liquidate the bank. Its shares were bought by Ziraat Bank and Halkbank, two other public banks.

References

Banks established in 1946
Banks disestablished in 2001
Banks of Turkey
Turkish brands
Defunct banks of Turkey